Sean Cranney (born 2 October 1973) is an Australian former association football player.

Playing career

Club career
Cranney played for Taringa Rovers Soccer Football Club before joining Brisbane United in the Queensland state league in 1992 and 1993. In 1994, he was signed to National Soccer League team Brisbane Strikers. At the Strikers he played five seasons before moving to Northern Spirit for the 1990/2000 season.

International career
Cranney played for Australia at the 1993 FIFA World Youth Championship.

Cranney made his full international debut in November 1996 for Australia in an OFC Nations Cup match against New Zealand in Christchurch. He played two further matches for Australia, one against New Zealand five days after his debut and the other against South Africa in September 1997. In all three matches for Australia he came on a substitute.

Honours

Club
Brisbane Strikers
National Soccer League
Championship Winner:1996–97
League Runner Up:1996–97

International
Australia
OFC Nations Cup
Winner:1996

References

1973 births
Living people
Australian soccer players
National Soccer League (Australia) players
Association football midfielders
Australia international soccer players
Brisbane Strikers FC players
1996 OFC Nations Cup players